Under Capricorn is a 1949 British historical thriller film directed by Alfred Hitchcock about a couple in Australia who started out as lady and stable boy in Ireland, and who are now bound together by a horrible secret. The film is based on the play by John Colton and Margaret Linden, which in turn is based on the novel Under Capricorn (1937) by Helen Simpson. The screenplay was written by James Bridie from an adaptation by Hume Cronyn. This was Hitchcock's second film in Technicolor, and like his preceding color film Rope (1948), it features 9- and 10-minute long takes.

The film is set in colonial Sydney, New South Wales, Australia during the early 19th century. Under Capricorn is one of several Hitchcock films that are not typical thrillers: instead it is a mystery involving a love triangle. Although the film is not exactly a murder mystery, it does feature a previous killing, a "wrong man" scenario, a sinister housekeeper, class conflict, and very high levels of emotional tension, both on the surface and underneath.

The title Under Capricorn refers to the Tropic of Capricorn, which bisects Australia. Capricornus is a constellation; Capricorn is an astrological sign associated with the goat.

Plot
In 1831, Sydney is a frontier town, full of rough ex-convicts from the British Isles. The new Governor, Sir Richard, arrives with his charming and cheery but indolent second cousin, the Honourable Charles Adare.

Charles, who is hoping to make his fortune, is befriended by gruff Samson Flusky, a prosperous businessman who was previously a transported convict, apparently a murderer. Sam says that, because he has bought the legal limit of land, he wants Charles to buy land and then sell it to him for a profit so that Sam can accumulate more frontier territory. Though the Governor orders him not to go, Charles is invited to dinner at Sam's house.

Charles discovers that he already knows Sam's wife, Lady Henrietta, an aristocrat who was a good friend of Charles's sister when they were all children in Ireland. Lady Henrietta is now an alcoholic who is socially shunned.

Sam invites Charles to stay at his house, hoping it will cheer up his wife, who is on the verge of madness. The housekeeper, Milly, has completely taken over the running of the household, and is the one who secretly supplies Lady Henrietta with alcohol, hoping to destroy her and win Sam's affections.

Gradually, Charles restores Henrietta's self-confidence. They become closer and closer, and eventually they share a passionate kiss. But Henrietta explains that she and Sam are bound together most profoundly: when she was young, Sam was the handsome stable boy. Overcome with desire, they ran away and married at Gretna Green.

Henrietta's brother, furious that aristocratic Henrietta had paired up with a lowly servant, confronted them. Her brother shot at them and missed; she then shot her brother fatally. Sam made a false confession to save her and was sent to the penal colony in Australia. She followed him and waited seven years in abject poverty for his release.

After listening to Milly's greatly exaggerated stories of what Charles did in Lady Henrietta's bedroom, Sam becomes furious and orders Charles to leave. Taking Sam's favourite mare in the dark, Charles has a fall and the horse breaks a leg. Sam has to shoot her dead and, in a subsequent struggle over the gun, seriously wounds Charles. Sam will now be prosecuted again for attempted murder. At the hospital, Henrietta confesses to the Governor that Sam was wrongly accused of the first crime of murder; she was the one who shot and killed her brother. By law she should be deported back to Ireland to stand trial.

Milly, still plying Henrietta with drink, is using a real shrunken head to fake hallucinations. Milly then attempts to kill Henrietta with an overdose of sedatives. She is caught in the act, and ordered out in disgrace.

The Governor, Sir Richard, has Sam arrested and charged with the attempted murder of Charles. Sir Richard ignores Henrietta's claim that Sam is innocent of both crimes. However, Charles decides to bend the truth; he says, on his word as a gentleman, that there was no confrontation, and no struggle over the gun. It was all an accident.

Finally we see Sam and Henrietta together smiling at the dock. Charles is going back to Ireland, and they bid him a fond farewell.

Cast 
 Ingrid Bergman as Lady Henrietta Flusky, old friend of Charles' sister
 Joseph Cotten as Samson "Sam" Flusky, successful businessman and Henrietta's husband
 Michael Wilding as Hon. Charles Adare, second cousin of the governor
 Margaret Leighton as Milly, Flusky's scheming housekeeper
 Cecil Parker as the new Governor of New South Wales, Sir Richard
 Denis O'Dea as Mr. Corrigan, Attorney General
 Jack Watling as Winter, Flusky's paroled butler
 Harcourt Williams as the Coachman
 John Ruddock as Mr. Cedric Potter, bank manager
 Bill Shine as Mr. Banks
 Victor Lucas as the Rev. Smiley
 Ronald Adam as Mr. Riggs
 Francis de Wolff as Major Wilkins
 G. H. Mulcaster as Dr. Macallister
 Olive Sloane as Sal
 Maureen Delany as Flo 
 Julia Lang as Susan 
 Betty McDermott as Martha 
 Martin Benson as Man Carrying Shrunken Head (uncredited)
 Lloyd Pearson as Land Agent (uncredited)

Production
The film was co-produced by Hitchcock and Sidney Bernstein for their short-lived production company, Transatlantic Pictures, and released through Warner Bros.

The film was Hitchcock's second film in Technicolor, and uses ten-minute takes similar to those in Hitchcock's previous film Rope (1948).

The long take 
In Style and Meaning: Studies in the Detailed Analysis of Film, Ed Gallafent says:

The use of the long take in Under Capricorn relates to three elements of film's meaning.

 Ideas of accessible and inaccessible space as expressed in the gothic house.
 The form in which characters inhabit their past
 The divergence or convergence of eyelines – the gaze that cannot, or must meet another’s.

All of these three elements can be linked to concepts of Guilt and Shame.  In 1 and 2, the question is how something is felt to be present.  In 3, it is difference between representation or sharing, of the past as flashback, and of the past as spoken narrative, where part of what is being articulated is precisely the inaccessibility of the past, its experience being locked inside the speaker.  As for 3, the avoided gaze is determining physical sign of shame.

Gallafent, professor of film at University of Warwick, also explains these aspects of Under Capricorn:

The inscription on the Flusky's mansion — Minyago Yugilla — means "Why weepest thou?"

St. Mary Magdalene (the patron saint of penitent sinners) in religious iconography: the bare feet, skull, the flail, the looking glass in which the beholder’s face is not always reflected, the jewels cast down to floor. All of these images are in the film. Sources for the imagery that Hitchcock might have had in mind are the paintings St. Mary Magdalene With a Candle (1630–1635) and St. Mary Magdalene With a Mirror (1635–1645), both by Georges de La Tour.

Note: "Minyago Yugilla", according to one source, is not written in a real language. However, according to other sources, it is in Kamilaroi (Gamilaraay), a now moribund Australian aboriginal language. See also this similar translation of the phrase "Minyilgo yugila."   Further to be noted may be that "Woman, why weepest thou?" can be found in the Holy Bible in the Gospel of St John, 20:15.

Production credits
The production credits on the film were as follows:
 Director - Alfred Hitchcock 
 Writing - James Bridie (screenplay), Hume Cronyn (adaptation)
 Cinematography - Jack Cardiff (director of photography)
 Art direction - Thomas N. Morahan (production design); Philip Stockford (set dresser)
 Technicolor color director - Natalie Kalmus 
 Costume design - Roger K. Furse 
 Assistant director - C. Foster Kemp
 Production management - Fred Ahern (production manager), John Palmer (unit manager)
 Editor - A. S. Bates 
 Operators of camera movement - Paul Beeson, Ian Craig, David MacNeilly, Jack Haste
 Sound - Peter Handford (sound recordist)
 Continuity - Peggy Singer
 Makeup artist - Charles Parker
 Music - Richard Addinsell (musical score), Louis Levy (musical director)

Background
 Alfred Hitchcock cameo: A signature occurrence in three-quarters of Hitchcock's films, he can be seen in the town square during a parade, wearing a blue coat and brown hat at the beginning of the film. He is also one of three men on the steps of the Government House 10 minutes later.
 In Truffaut/Hitchcock, Hitchcock told François Truffaut that Under Capricorn was such a failure that Bankers Trust Company, which had financed the film, repossessed the film, which then was unavailable until the first US network television screening in 1968. In the Truffaut interview, Hitchcock also mentioned a New York Times reviewer who wrote that the viewer had to wait almost 100 minutes for the first suspenseful moment.
 Playwright James Bridie, who wrote the screenplay for Under Capricorn, is famous for his Biblical plays, such as his Jonah and the Whale.
 Cecil Parker's character Sir Richard may be a representation of General Sir Richard Bourke, who was Governor of New South Wales from 1831 to 1837.

Reception

Box-office
According to Warners' records, the film earned $1.21 million domestically and $1.46 million in foreign territories.

It is thought that the audience had imagined Under Capricorn was going to be a thriller, which it was not — the plot was a domestic love triangle with a few thriller elements thrown in — and this ultimately led to its box-office failure. However, the public reception of the film may have been damaged by the revelation in 1949 of the married Bergman's adulterous relationship with, and subsequent pregnancy by, the married Italian film director Roberto Rossellini.

Critical response
The film was not well received by critics. Bosley Crowther of The New York Times wrote that "it seems that neither Miss Bergman nor Mr. Hitchcock has tangled here with stuff of any better than penny-dreadful substance and superficial demands." Variety called it "overlong and talky, with scant measure of the Hitchcock thriller tricks that could have sharpened general reception," while John McCarten of The New Yorker wrote that "this picture simultaneously succeeds in insulting the Australians, the Irish, and the average intelligence." Richard L. Coe of The Washington Post wrote: "The triangle performances are splendid, but the lines and situations the three principals are called upon to face are trite indeed ... Jame's Bridie's script, from a Helen Simpson novel adapted by Hume Cronyn, has little to be proud of, is indeed unintentionally hilarious at times." The Monthly Film Bulletin was also negative, writing: "The story is not enlivened by any qualities in the dialogue, which is crude and frequently stilted, or in the direction, which surely represents the nadir of Hitchcock's present period. It is extraordinary that this director, responsible for some of the most brilliant British films of the thirties—lively, fast, and full of incident—should return to this country from Hollywood for the sake of a ponderous novelette, which even more than Rope shows a preoccupation with complicated camera movements of no dramatic value whatsoever."
 
Harrison's Reports printed a mostly positive review, praising Bergman for "another striking performance" and adding, "The story is not without its weak points, particularly in that much of the footage is given more to talk than to movement, but Alfred Hitchcock's directorial skill manages to overcome most of the script's deficiencies by building up situations that thrill and hold the spectator in tense suspense." Edwin Schallert of the Los Angeles Times was also positive, calling it "a film of great class. It may fall short of Hitchcock's greatest in some respects because it lacks their vital suspense and intense interest. Yet its values are so noteworthy that it may definitely be recommended to all film-viewers."

In Peter Bogdanovich's interview with Alfred Hitchcock, Bogdanovich mentions that French critics writing for Cahiers du cinéma in the 1950s considered Under Capricorn one of Hitchcock's finest films.

A September 2019 two-day symposium in London has renewed attention to the film.

See also

 1949 in film
 British films of 1949
 List of drama films
 List of films set in Australia

References

External links 
 
 
 
 
 

1949 films
British historical drama films
1940s English-language films
Films based on British novels
Films set in New South Wales
Films set in colonial Australia
Films set in 1831
Films directed by Alfred Hitchcock
Films produced by Alfred Hitchcock
Films about alcoholism
Films scored by Richard Addinsell
Films with screenplays by Hume Cronyn
1940s historical drama films
Warner Bros. films
1940s British films